Vārve parish is an administrative unit of the Ventspils Municipality, Latvia.The parish has a population of 1916 (as of 1/07/2010) and covers an area of 125.442 km2.

Villages of Vārve parish 

 Celužu ciems
 Cirpstenes dižciems
 Cirpstenes mazciems
 Grigaļu ciems
 Jaunmuiža
 Leči
 Liezdes ciems
 Mežsētas
 Pasiekstes ciems
 Roces ciems
 Silnieku ciems
 Vārve
 Veltiņu ciems
 Ventava
 Zūras

Parishes of Latvia
Ventspils Municipality